Dibromochloromethane is a colorless to yellow, heavy and nonflammable compound with formula . It is a trihalomethane.
The substance has a sweet odour.  Small quantities of dibromochloromethane are produced in ocean by algae.

Applications
Dibromochloromethane was formerly used as a flame retardant and as an intermediate in chemicals manufacturing. Today it is used only as a laboratory reagent. Dibromochloromethane is also a disinfection byproduct, formed by the reaction of chlorine with natural organic matter and bromide ions in the raw water supply. As a result, it is commonly found in chlorinated drinking water.
Also, it is able to reduce methane production in ruminants by 79 %

See also
 Asparagopsis taxiformis

References

External links
 Dibromochlormethane in greenfacts.org glossary
 Dibromochloromethane toxicological review
 ToxFAQ for bromoform at ATSDR

Organochlorides
Organobromides